Tethong is a surname. Notable people with the surname include:

 Wangpo Tethong (born 1963), Swiss-Tibetan writer, activist and politician
 Tenzin Tethong (born 1947), Tibetan political figure and former Prime Minister (Kalon Tripa) of Central Tibetan Administration

Tibetan-language surnames